Genie:us is the eighth Korean-language mini album from South Korean boy band Pentagon. It was released on March 27, 2019 by Cube Entertainment. The album consists of six tracks, with "Sha La La" serving as the album's title track. This is the first Korean-language EP the band has released as a nine-member group, with original member E’Dawn departing the group in late 2018. Member Kino did not participate in stage promotions for "Sha La La" due to an ankle injury he suffered in January. Starting on April 16, 2019, the group promoted the song "Spring Snow" for a week, for which Kino was able to participate in.

Name 
The album name is a portmanteau of the words "genie", from the story of Aladdin, and "us" to create "genius". The title of the project has the connotation that "all people have talents that make them genius in their own field".

Background and release 
On March 15, 2019, Pentagon announced the title and release date of their eighth Korean-language mini album. The lead single "Sha La La" was teased in videos on March 18 and 19, although the title was unknown at the time. A time schedule of the comeback was released on March 19. The track list was released on March 20, and their concert "2019 Pentagon Concert - PRISM", to be held on April 27 and 28 in Seoul, was announced on the same day. Concept images were released on March 21 and 22. The audio teaser for the mini-album was released on March 25, and the music video teaser for "Sha La La" was released the next day. The music video was released on March 27 alongside the album. On the same day, a media showcase was held to commemorate the release of the mini-album at Blue Square iMarket Hall in Yongsan-gu, Seoul.

Musicality 

The group continues their image as a self-producing idol group, as each song on the album was produced by the members and all members are credited as writers and producers. The songs on the album are filled with messages aimed to excite, comfort, encourage, and give hope to the listeners.

Songs 
"Sha La La" is a future house track with elements of hip hop and rock. The Korean title (신토불이) is an abbreviation of the phrase "신나는 토요일 불타는 이밤", which translates to "let’s light up this Saturday night". The song contains witty lyrics and dynamic dance sounds that aim to ease stress. Billboard highlighted the track's "vibrant soundscape that puts the emphasis on Pentagon’s multi-faceted vocal delivery". Leader Hui said, "You might have moments of stress and feelings of suffocation on your way from work and in school. I wrote the song to resolve them".

"Lost Paradise (Hip Hop Unit)" is a dark hip hop track sung by Hui, Yuto, Kino, and Wooseok, all of whom wrote and composed the song. The members tell their past selves that they are too young to be worried about failure. The tracks spreads the hopeful message that, regardless of one's struggles, a paradise exists within one's self. "Till... (Ballad Unit)" is a ballad sung by Jinho, Hongseok, Shinwon, Yeo One, and Yan An. The piano sounds at the beginning and the full band towards the end enhance the song's theme of perseverance. "Alien" is a witty hip hop track wherein Pentagon expresses their wishes to become a group with a unique, alien-like personality. "Spring Snow" is happy, exciting alternative rock song about the group's experience during the Spring of 2018. In the final track, "Round 1", the members playfully diss each other with inside jokes. Every member of Pentagon had a hand in writing and producing the song.

Track listing

Accolades

Charts

Certifications and sales

References 

2019 EPs
Cube Entertainment EPs
Pentagon (South Korean band) EPs
Kakao M EPs
Albums produced by Hui (singer)
Albums produced by Wooseok
Albums produced by Kino (singer)
Albums produced by Yuto